The Bluestone family murders occurred in Gravesend, Kent, England on 28 August 2001. Police officer Karl Bluestone murdered his wife Jill and two of the couple's children with a claw hammer before killing himself in the garage. The two oldest children survived the attack.

Events 
Karl Bluestone joined Kent Police in 1987. He had a history of domestic violence, had accused his wife of having an affair before the murders and had bugged her car with a listening device. In June 1999, he was arrested for injuring one of his children when he threw a cup across the room. His wife Jill had run to call neighbours for help.

On 28 August 2001, seven-year-old Jessica Bluestone ran to neighbours shouting "my daddy is trying to hurt me." The police were called and they arrived to the property at 10pm on Marling Way in the Riverview Park area and found bludgeoned body of Jill Bluestone The couple's three-year-old son, Henry was found dead in his cot. Jill had suffered 30 blows to the head.

PC Bluestone was found hanging in the garage at the end of the garden. The family's three other children were taken to the Darent Valley Hospital in Dartford, where 18-month-old Chandler died of his injuries. The couple's eight-year-old son, Jack was transferred to London's Kings College Hospital with severe injuries.

Victims

 Jill Bluestone, 31
 Henry Bluestone, 3
 Chandler Bluestone, 1

The funerals of Jill Bluestone and her two sons were held at Nunthorpe Methodist Church in Middlesbrough on 7 September 2001. Karl was given a separate burial.

Inquest 
The November 2001  inquest revealed that Bluestone attacked his family after his wife told him that she was leaving and taking the children with her.

Parliament 
The case was brought up in the House of Commons on 19 July 2002. Labour MP for Luton South Margaret Moran asked Minister of State for Policing John Denham how many domestic violence incidents Kent Police had recorded. The minister confirmed that four incidents had been recorded but no disciplinary action was undertaken in relation to any of them.

Media coverage 
Jeanette Winterson criticised the media coverage of the case.

References 

August 2001 events in the United Kingdom
2001 deaths
2000s in Kent
2001 murders in the United Kingdom
Familicides
Murder in Kent
August 2001 crimes
Murdered English children
Murder–suicides in the United Kingdom
History of Gravesend, Kent
Incidents of domestic violence
Kent Police officers
Hammer assaults